Helga Schmidt-Neuber (19 February 1937 – 14 September 2018) was a German swimmer. She competed at the 1956, 1960 and 1964 Summer Olympics.

References

1937 births
2018 deaths
German female swimmers
Olympic swimmers of the United Team of Germany
Swimmers at the 1956 Summer Olympics
Swimmers at the 1960 Summer Olympics
Swimmers at the 1964 Summer Olympics
Sportspeople from Halle (Saale)